Garshom is a 1999 Indian Malayalam film,  directed by P. T. Kunju Muhammed. The film stars Urvashi, Murali, Madhu and Siddique in the lead roles. The film has musical score by Ramesh Narayan. It was the debut film of noted lyricist Rafeeq Ahammed. It won the John Abraham Award for Best Malayalam Film in 1998.

Plot
Nasseruddin is a straightforward man who has returned to India from the Gulf after spending 12 years doing hard labor. He hasn't been able to save up much for his wife, mother and two children. However, he has a very positive, calm mindset and tries doing business. His relatives are not keen to help him, although they are rich. A financial divide clearly appears between his family and their relatives leading to stressful situations for his children, wife and himself.

Being a very truthful and straightforward person, he loses his business. He is arrested by the police for failure to repay a bank loan as well. After being bailed out, depressed and dejected, he returns home where his wife consoles him. His mother suggests that he head back to the Gulf to look for work, which he does.

Cast

Soundtrack
The music was composed by Ramesh Narayan and the lyrics were written by Rafeeq Ahamed.

References

External links
 

1999 films
1990s Malayalam-language films